The 2008 Copa do Brasil de Futebol Feminino was the second staging of the competition. The competition started on November 1, 2008, and was concluded on December 10, 2008. 32 clubs of all regions of Brazil participated of the cup, which is organized by the Brazilian Football Confederation (CBF). The champion was Santos.

Competition format
The competition was contested by 32 clubs in a knock-out format where all rounds were played over two legs and the away goals rule was used, but in the first round if the away team won the first leg with an advantage of at least two goals, the second leg was not played and the club automatically qualified to the next round.

Participating teams
The 2008 participating teams are the following clubs:

Table

Semifinals

Group 29

Group 30

Final

References

2008
Copa Do Brasil De Futebol Feminino, 2008
Copa Do Brasil
Copa